Henry Matson Waite may refer to:
 Henry Matson Waite (judge)
 Henry Matson Waite (engineer)